Events from the year 1542 in Ireland.

Incumbent
Lord/Monarch: Henry VIII

Events
15 February – 7/10 March: the Parliament of Ireland meets in Limerick and re-enacts the Crown of Ireland Act, declaring King Henry VIII of England and his heirs to be Kings of Ireland, for the benefit of Munster and Connacht.
February–March – first Jesuit mission to Ireland.
June 18 – Crown of Ireland Act 1542 is enacted, ending the Lordship of Ireland and creating the Kingdom of Ireland. 
August 8 – St Macartan's Cathedral, Clogher, is created from the former abbey church.
September 7 – Bernard O'Higgins is consecrated as Roman Catholic Bishop of Elphin.
Dissolution of the Monasteries – establishments dissolved include:
Armagh Friary.
Ballintubber Abbey.
Claregalway Friary.
Fermoy Monastery.
Kells Abbey, Co. Antrim (1 February).
Kilcrea Friary (friars remaining in occupancy under protection of the MacCarthy family).
Knockmoy Abbey (24 May).
Movilla Abbey.
Rattoo Abbey, Ballyduff, County Kerry.
Timoleague Friary.
Woodburn Abbey, Co. Antrim (1 March).
Youghal Nunnery.
November 25 - Counties of Meath and Westmeath Act shires these two counties.

Births
Edmund O'Donnell, Jesuit martyr (k. 1575)

Deaths
August 9 – Margaret FitzGerald, Countess of Ormond, noblewoman.
Christopher St Lawrence, 5th Baron Howth, nobleman (b. c.1485)

References

 
1540s in Ireland
Ireland
Years of the 16th century in Ireland